Raegan Oranje is a South African rugby union player for the  in the Currie Cup. His regular position is scrum-half.

Oranje was named in the  side for the 2021 Currie Cup Premier Division. He had previously been named in the  squad for the 2020–21 Currie Cup Premier Division.

References

South African rugby union players
Living people
Rugby union scrum-halves
Griquas (rugby union) players
1996 births